Boana steinbachi is a frog that endemic to Amazonia.  It has been found in Brazil, Peru, and  Bolivia.

References

Boana
Frogs of South America
Fauna of Brazil
Fauna of Bolivia
Fauna of Peru
Amphibians described in 1905
Taxa named by George Albert Boulenger